Qazi Touqeer is an  Indian singer, who won the show Fame Gurukul – along with Ruprekha Banerjee. He sings in the Kashmiri, Hindi and Urdu languages. On 20 October 2005, he managed to grab the top prize along with Ruprekha Banerjee. He was voted by the Indian public to be the winner of Fame Gurukul, India's version of "Fame Academy." The president of India, in regards to Qazi Touqeer, declared him to be the hero of Kashmir. As a result of Qazi's success, a plethora of Kashmiri youth auditioned in Indian Idol tryouts, which were held in Srinagar, a city in the Kashmir Valley.

He released a new album out along with Ruprekha Banerjee at the end of 2005. Qazi had no formal training before Fame Gurukul.

He injured himself while rehearsing for his acting debut film, Take Off. Qazi was rehearsing at Ganesh Acharya Studios when he fell down and injured his neck.

Family
Qazi's father was a lawyer. His mother is a teacher, and his uncle: Qazi Rafi was a Kashmiri singer. The young man grew up mimicking Indian movie protagonists in the Mughal Gardens of Srinagar, posting in front of a video camera held by his brother. He was also guided by his father who had a little bit of knowledge about music.

Discography

Albums

TV appearances

He broke the records for getting the highest votes in any of the reality shows then. He was voted back to safety every time he went to danger zone by the Indian public. His charming looks and sincerity got him his first Fame on TV.

Filmography

References

External links
Review of Qazi Touqeer and Ruprekha Banerjee's first album: Jodi No. 1
A picture of Qazi Touqeer

1980s births
Living people
Kashmiri people
Fame Gurukul contestants
People from Srinagar
Singing talent show winners